LFK NG from Lenkflugkörper Neue Generation ("New Generation Guided Missile") is under development by MBDA Germany and Diehl Defence as the new short-range surface-to-air missile system for the German Army as a replacement for its Roland air defence systems and as a part of the army's new SysFla air defence program to supplement the new Ozelot air defence systems.

The missile features a highly sensitive infrared homing seeker, which is capable of identifying targets with an extremely low infrared signature, such as other missiles or UAVs, but also aircraft and helicopters.

LFK NG will also have a penetrator warhead to engage semi-armored targets such as gunship helicopters.

Platforms
The missile can be launched vertically, e.g., from stationary launch platforms, trucks or armored vehicles such as the GTK Boxer and the Ozelot, or horizontally from helicopters such as the Eurocopter Tiger.

Being a part of Germany's SysFla project, the LFK NG will be integrated in stationary and mobile air defence launch platforms.

Specifications
Length: 1.8 m
Caliber: 110 mm
Range: 10,000 m
Speed: Up to Mach 2.2
Weight: 28 kg
Warhead: Up to 2.5 kg

See also
MEADS – the future air defence system of the German German Air Force.
MANTIS – the very short-range protection system of the German Army within the "SysFla" program.
SPYDER
Machbet

References

External links
 LFK NG on the homepage of MBDA
 LFK NG on the homepage of Diehl BGT Defence

Post–Cold War weapons of Germany
Surface-to-air missiles of Germany
21st-century surface-to-air missiles